Leonardas is a Lithuanian masculine given name.

List of people named Leonardas

Leonardas Abramavičius (?-1960),  Lithuanian chess player
Leonardas Andriekus (1914-2003), Lithuanian poet 

Lithuanian masculine given names